Pedra do Baú and the 'Pedra do Baú complex are rock formations in the Mantiqueira Mountains (Serra da Mantiqueira). They are located in the municipality of São Bento do Sapucaí, São Paulo, Brazil.

Geography
The gneiss rock complex comprises three distinct "rock formation landmarks": Pedra do Baú, Bauzinho, and Ana Chata.

Rock climbing 
There are over 200 rock climbing routes in the complex, ranging from 15m to 400m in height.

Ecotourism
The formation is a popular site for rock climbing, paragliding, and other forms of ecotourism.

References

Sources

External links

 Pedradobau.com.br: official Pedra do Baú website

Rock formations of Brazil
Gneiss
Landforms of São Paulo (state)
Natural monuments of Brazil